The Roman Catholic Archdiocese of Brisbane is a Latin Church metropolitan archdiocese of the Catholic Church in Australia located in Brisbane and covering the South East region of Queensland, Australia.

Part of the Roman Catholic Ecclesiastical Province of Brisbane, the region covered was initially administered by the Archdiocese of Sydney. In 1859 the Diocese of Brisbane was erected, and elevated as an archdiocese in 1887. The archdiocese is the metropolitan of the suffragan dioceses of Cairns, Rockhampton, Toowoomba and Townsville.

The Cathedral of St Stephen is the seat of the Catholic Archbishop of Brisbane. On 12 May 2012 Mark Coleridge was installed as the sixth Archbishop of Brisbane, the seventh Bishop of Brisbane.

History
The Diocese of Brisbane was established in 1859, with responsibility for the entire state of Queensland. Prior to its establishment, Queensland was part of the Roman Catholic Archdiocese of Sydney.

On 27 January 1877 Pope Pius IX excised the northern part of the Diocese of Brisbane from Cape Hinchinbrook and then west to the border with South Australia (now Northern Territory) to create the Vicariate Apostolic of Queensland (later the Diocese of Cairns.

On 29 December 1882, the Diocese of Rockhampton was excised from the Archdiocese of Brisbane. The new Rockhampton diocese had responsibility for northern Queensland while the Brisbane archdiocese retained responsibility for southern Queensland.

In 1929, the Diocese of Toowoomba was excised from the Archdiocese of Brisbane.

Bishops

Ordinaries
The following people have been appointed as Roman Catholic Archbishops of Brisbane or any of its precursor titles:
{| class="wikitable"
!Order
!Name
!Title
!Date enthroned
!Reign ended
!Term of office
!Reason for term end
|-
|align="center"| ||James Quinn † ||Bishop of Brisbane ||align="center" |14 April 1859 ||align="center" |18 August 1881 ||align="right"| ||Died in office
|-
|rowspan=2 align="center"| ||rowspan=2 |Robert Dunne † ||Bishop of Brisbane ||align="center" |3 January 1882  ||align="center" |10 May 1887 ||align="right"| ||Elevated as Archbishop of Brisbane
|-
|Archbishop of Brisbane ||align="center" |10 May 1887 ||align="center" |13 January 1917 ||align="right"| ||Died in office
|-
|rowspan=2 align="center"| ||rowspan=2 |James Duhig † ||Coadjutor Archbishop of Brisbane ||align="center" |27 February 1912 ||align="center" |13 January 1917 ||align="right"| ||Succeeded as Archbishop of Brisbane
|-
|Archbishop of Brisbane ||align="center" |13 January 1917 ||align="center" |10 April 1965 ||align="right"| ||Died in office
|-
|rowspan=2 align="center"| ||rowspan=2 |Patrick Mary O'Donnell † ||Coadjutor Archbishop of Brisbane ||align="center" |8 November 1948 ||align="center" |10 April 1965 ||align="right"| ||Succeeded as Archbishop of Brisbane
|-
|Archbishop of Brisbane ||align="center" |10 April 1965  ||align="center" |5 March 1973 ||align="right"| ||Retired and titled Archbishop Emeritus of Brisbane
|-
|align="center"| ||Francis Roberts Rush † ||Archbishop of Brisbane ||align="center" |5 March 1973 ||align="center" |3 December 1991 ||align="right"| ||Retired and titled Archbishop Emeritus of Brisbane
|-
|align="center"| ||John Bathersby † ||Archbishop of Brisbane  ||align="center" |3 December 1991 ||align="center" |14 November 2011 ||align="right"| ||Retired and titled Archbishop Emeritus of Brisbane
|-
|align="center"| ||Mark Coleridge ||Archbishop of Brisbane  ||align="center" |11 May 2012 ||align="center" |present ||align="right"| ||n/a
|}

Coadjutors are included in the table above.

Auxiliary bishops
Current
Kenneth Michael Howell (2017-)
Tim Norton SVD (2022-)
Former
Henry Joseph Kennedy † (1967-1971), appointed Bishop of Armidale
 John Joseph Gerry † (1975-2003)
Eugene James Cuskelly, M.S.C. † (1982-1996)
Michael Ernest Putney † (1995-2001), appointed Bishop of Townsville
Brian Vincent Finnigan (2002-2015)
 Joseph John Oudeman, O.F.M. Cap. (2002-2017)

Other priests of the diocese who became bishops
James Byrne † , appointed Bishop of Toowoomba in 1929
Andrew Gerard Tynan † , appointed Bishop of Rockhampton in 1946
Edward John Doody † , appointed Bishop of Armidale in 1948
John Ahern Torpie † , appointed Bishop of Cairns in 1967
Brian Heenan, appointed Bishop of Rockhampton in 1991
James Foley, appointed Bishop of Cairns in 1992
William Martin Morris, appointed Bishop of Toowoomba in 1992
Michael Fabian McCarthy, appointed Bishop of Rockhampton in 2014
Anthony Randazzo, appointed an Auxiliary Bishop of Sydney in 2016
Timothy James Harris, appointed Bishop of Townsville in 2017
† = deceased

Cathedral

The gothic revival cathedral is located on a site bounded by Elizabeth, Charlotte and Edward Streets, in the Australian city of Brisbane. Built between 1864 and 1922, with extensions made in 1989, the cathedral was established with James Quinn as its first bishop. Quinn planned to construct a large cathedral to accommodate a growing congregation.  On 26 December 1863, the Feast of St Stephen, Quinn laid the foundation stone for a grand cathedral designed by Benjamin Backhouse. Backhouse's original design was changed and downsized numerous times over the course of the cathedral's completion, mainly for economic reasons.

In 1927, there was a plan to replace St Stephen's with a new Holy Name Cathedral to be built in Fortitude Valley, Brisbane. However, funding was only sufficient to build the crypt. Eventually the project was abandoned, the crypt demolished and the land sold.

Parishes

Acacia Ridge – Our Lady of Fatima
Albany Creek – All Saints
Alexandra Hills – St Anthony
Annerley Ekibin Catholic Parish
Ashgrove – St Finbarr (Jubilee Catholic Parish)
Aspley – Our Lady & St Dympna
Auchenflower – St Ignatius
Banyo Nundah Parish
Bardon – St Mary Magdalen (Jubilee Catholic Parish)
Beaudesert – St Mary's
Beenleigh – St Patrick
Birkdale – St Mary Mackillop
Boonah – All Saints
Booval – Sacred Heart
Bowen Hills – Our Lady of Victories
Bracken Ridge – St Joseph & St Anthony
Bray Park – Holy Spirit
Brisbane – Cathedral of St Stephen
Browns Plains – St Bernardine
Bulimba – St Peter and Paul
Buranda – St Luke
Burleigh Heads – Infant Saviour
Burpengary – St Eugene de Mazenod
Caboolture – St Peter
Caloundra – Our Lady of the Rosary
Camp Hill – St Thomas
Cannon Hill – St Oliver Plunkett
Capalaba – St Lukes
Carina – Our Lady of Graces
Chermside West – St Gerard Majella
Childers – Sacred Heart
Clayfield – St Agatha
Cleveland – Star of the Sea
Coolangatta – St Augustine's
Coomera – St Mary's Catholic Community
Coorparoo – Our Lady of Mt Carmel
Coorparoo – St James Parish
Coorparoo Heights – Regina Caeli
Corinda – Graceville Parish

Daisy Hill – St Edward the Confessor
Darra Jindalee – Our Lady of the Sacred Heart / Twelve Apostles
Dorrington – St Michael's
Dutton Park – St Ita
Enoggera – St John the Baptist
Esk – St Mel
Everton Park – Immaculate Conception
Gatton – St Mary's
Gayndah – St Joseph
Geebung – St Kevin's
Goodna – St Francis Xavier
Gordon Park – St Carthage
Greenslopes – St Maroun's
Grovely – St William's
Gympie – St Patrick's
Hamilton – St Cecilia's
Hendra – Our Lady Help of Christians
Herston – St Joan of Arc (Jubilee Catholic Parish)
Hervey Bay City Parish
Holland Park – Mt Gravatt
Inala – St Mark's
Indooroopilly – Holy Family
Ipswich – St Mary's
Kangaroo Point – East Brisbane – St Joseph's
Kedron – St Therese – The Little Flower
Kenmore – Our Lady of the Rosary
Kingaroy – St Mary's
Kingston – Marsden – St Maximilian Kolbe
Laidley – St Patrick's
Leichhardt – Immaculate Heart of Mary
Loganholme – St Matthew's
Lutwyche Parish
Manly – St John Vianney
Maroochydore – Stella Maris
Maryborough – St Mary's
Mitchelton – Our Lady of Dolours
Moorooka Salisbury
Murgon – St Joseph's

Nambour – St Joseph's
Nanango – Our Lady Help of Christians
Nerang – St Brigid's
New Farm – Holy Spirit
Newmarket – St Ambrose (Jubilee Catholic Parish)
Noosa District – Our Lady of Perpetual Succour
North Ipswich – St Joseph
Petrie – Our Lady of the Way
Pine Rivers – Holy Spirit
Red Hill – St Brigid (Jubilee Catholic Parish)
Redcliffe – Holy Cross
Rochedale – St Peter's
Rosalie – Sacred Heart (Jubilee Catholic Parish)
Rosewood – St Brigid's
Runaway Bay – Holy Family
Sandgate – Brighton Parish
South Brisbane – St Mary's
South Brisbane – St Clements
Southport – Mary Immaculate
Springfield – Our Lady of the Southern Cross
St John's Wood – The Gap Parish
St Lucia – St Thomas Aquinas
Stafford – Our Lady Queen of Apostles
Stanley River Parish
Sunnybank – Our Lady of Lourdes
Surfers Paradise Parish
Toowong – St Ignatius
Upper Mt Gravatt – Wishart Parish
Victoria Point – St Rita
Wavell Heights – St Paschal
Wilston – St Columba
Woodridge – St Paul's
Woolloongabba – Protection of the Mother of God
Wynnum – Guardian Angels
Yeronga – St Sebastian
Zillmere – St Flannan's

Economic contribution
The Archdiocese contributes around $2.5 billion to the economy through its schools and other institutions, providing employment to 22,000 people.

The Archdiocese manages 98 parishes and 144 Catholic schools. It also provides services to 12,992 aged care and disability clients, support for 8362 seniors to live at home, support to 23,000 victims of domestic violence and help for 4,000 people with mental illness.

See also

 Roman Catholicism in Australia

References

External links
Catholic Archdiocese of Brisbane
Catholic Education, Archdiocese of Brisbane

Religion in Brisbane